Astier is a French surname. Notable people with the surname include:

Alexandre Astier (born 1974), a French writer, director, editor and actor
Alexandre Astier (born 1968), a French writer on the religions in India
Lilian Astier (born 1978), a French professional soccer player
Marcel Astier (1885–1947), a French politician
Raphaël Astier (born 1976), a French modern pentathlete

French-language surnames